Twin souls may refer to:
Soul dualism, the range of beliefs that a person has two or more kinds of souls
Soulmate, a person with whom one has a feeling of deep or natural affinity.